Abdellatif Khalf Abdellatif (born 2 June 1960) is an Egyptian wrestler. He competed in the lightweight Greco-Roman competition at the 1988 Summer Olympics.

References

External links
 

1960 births
Living people
Wrestlers at the 1988 Summer Olympics
Egyptian male sport wrestlers
Olympic wrestlers of Egypt